Calke is a small village and civil parish in the South Derbyshire district of Derbyshire, England. It includes the historic house Calke Abbey, a National Trust property, although the main entrance to its grounds is from the neighbouring village of Ticknall, where the population of Calke is included.

See also
Listed buildings in Calke

References

External links

Villages in Derbyshire
Civil parishes in Derbyshire
South Derbyshire District